"Ei Eerika pääse taivaaseen" ("Eerika Won't Go to Heaven") is a song recorded by Finnish pop rock band Haloo Helsinki! for their second studio album Enemmän kuin elää (2009). The song was released by EMI Finland as a promotional single for airplay on 11 August 2009 and peaked at number 24 on the Official Finnish Download Chart.

Charts

References

2009 songs
Haloo Helsinki! songs